Federico Vindver (born 18 August 1982) is an Argentine record producer, songwriter, multi-instrumentalist and composer based in Los Angeles, California.

Vindver has produced along with Timbaland and worked with artists such as Kanye West, Coldplay, Yung Tory, Beto Cuevas, Tee Grizzley, Nathy Peluso, Meghan Trainor, Pablo Alborán, Brockhampton, Ludacris, The Blossom, New City and Wisin among others.

He has worked on records that have earned him Grammy and Latin Grammy Awards, and he was named Top 5 producer and writer by Billboard.

Early life
Vindver was born in Buenos Aires, Argentina.  As a young man, he left the country during its financial crisis in 2002, visiting Spain and Mexico before receiving a full piano scholarship to the Frost School of Music at the University of Miami in Florida. While he studied jazz at college, he learned other musical genres elsewhere. He was playing in a practice room at UM when he was approached and asked if he would play in a local African-American church. There he learned about gospel, R&B and soul. He then became interested in technology and production.

"I was living in a practically destitute situation, because my parents couldn't help me financially and even though I had the full scholarship, I lived in a place where I didn't even have a bed," Vindver said. "At that time, an Argentine friend who lived in Miami gave me a computer that he didn't use, and there I downloaded cracked software to make music, and I started putting together the backing tracks for these gospel groups. As I did that, I started to like that a lot and I started to get more interested in producing, at first with the bands I played in."

Music career
In 2008, while still in college, he briefly became keyboardist and show producer for Lauryn Hill.
 
After graduation in 2008, Vindver met Ricky Martin’s musical director who connected him with Franco De Vita, and he worked with him as arranger and keyboardist. Then he co-wrote the song "Basta Ya" for Martin's Música + Alma + Sexo album, and toured to support it. Vindver continued to tour, playing keyboards with Latin artists Jennifer Lopez and Marc Anthony, then joined his wife to live in Los Angeles, California. At that time, he decided to focus full-time on production. In 2017, through manager/music executive Gary Marella, Vindver met Timbaland and both started working together. They made tracks for rock band Muse, pop vocalist Noah Cyrus, R&B singer Zayn.

In December 2018, Vindver and Timbaland were producing rap artist Saweetie and Lil Mosey, when Kanye West came to the studio. The next summer Vindver and West met again, and bonded over their mutual Christian faith. His early experience playing gospel in Miami churches appealed to West, and they decided to work together on the latter's next album, Jesus Is King.

In October 2019, Kanye West released Jesus is King, which featured 10 out of 11 songs produced by Vindver. Those 10 songs charted on the Billboard Hot 100. A month after the release of Jesus is King, four songs he co-wrote and produced appeared on the Coldplay album, Everyday Life. West's album debuted at No. 1 on the Billboard 200 album chart in the United States, while the Coldplay album entered the UK Album Chart at No. 1. Of the songs Vindver wrote on Everyday Life, two were released as singles and charted: "Orphans" went to No. 1 on Billboard’s Rock Airplay chart, while "Everyday Life" hit No. 14 on the Billboard Hot Rock & Alternative Songs chart.

In the following years, Vindver wrote and produced for Pharrell Williams, Chance the Rapper, Armin Van Buuren, Tee Grizzley, A$AP Ferg, Brockhampton, Missy Elliott, Ant Clemons,  among others.

In 2020, Vindver released an online platform for producers called BeatClub, that permits them to sell their music online and network with other producers and artists.

Vindver continued working with Timbaland, and that year the two producers joined Shucati, Rance, Angel Lόpez, and Sucuki, in working with Chance the Rapper on his track, "Found You", featuring Ludacris.

In November 2020, Josh Groban’s album, Harmony, was produced by Bernie Herms, but Vindver produced an additional song for the project—"The Fullest (Feat. Kirk Franklin)."

In 2021, Vindver co-wrote the single, "Higher Power" for Coldplay. The song was produced by Max Martin.  Also that year, he wrote and produced "We’re In This Together" for Justin Bieber's Freedom EP. ‘

Throughout his career, Vindver maintained a foothold in the Latin community, producing and writing for artists Ricky Martin ("Basta Ya"), Pablo Alborán ("Hablemos de amor"), C. Tangana ("Te Olvidaste feat. Omar Apollo"), Lali ("Fascinada", "Laligera"),  YEИDRY ("Ya"), and many more.

Awards

Discography

References

1982 births
Living people
Argentine emigrants to the United States
Argentine record producers
Argentine songwriters
Grammy Award winners
Latin Grammy Award winners
Male songwriters